The Venezuelan crisis of 1902–1903 was a naval blockade imposed against Venezuela by Great Britain, Germany, and Italy from December 1902 to February 1903, after President Cipriano Castro refused to pay foreign debts and damages suffered by European citizens in recent Venezuelan civil wars. Castro assumed that the American Monroe Doctrine would see Washington intervene to prevent European military intervention. However, at the time, United States president Theodore Roosevelt and his Department of State saw the doctrine as applying only to European seizure of territory, rather than intervention per se. With prior promises that no such seizure would occur, the U.S. was officially neutral and allowed the action to go ahead without objection. The blockade saw Venezuela's small navy quickly disabled, but Castro refused to give in, and instead agreed in principle to submit some of the claims to international arbitration, which he had previously rejected. Germany initially objected to this, arguing that some claims should be accepted by Venezuela without arbitration.

President Roosevelt years later claimed he forced the Germans to back down by sending his own larger fleet under and threatening war if the Germans landed. However he made no preparations for war against a major power, nor did he alert officials at the State Department, War Department, Navy Department or the Senate. 
 
With Castro failing to back down, U.S. pressure and increasingly negative British and American press reaction to the affair, the blockading nations agreed to a compromise, but maintained the blockade during negotiations over the details. This led to the signing of an agreement on 13 February 1903 which saw the blockade lifted, and Venezuela commit 30% of its customs duties to settling claims.

When the Permanent Court of Arbitration in The Hague subsequently awarded preferential treatment to the blockading powers against the claims of other nations, the U.S. feared this would encourage future European intervention. The episode contributed to the development of the Roosevelt Corollary to the Monroe Doctrine, asserting a right of the United States to intervene to stabilize the economic affairs of small states in the Caribbean and Central America if they were unable to pay their international debts, in order to preclude European intervention to do so.

Background 

At the turn of the 20th century, German traders dominated Venezuela's import/export sector and informal banking system. Most of these, however, had little influence in Berlin; rather it was German industrialists and bankers, including those associated with building railroads, who had connections and influence. The revolutionary turmoil of the last decade of the 19th century in Venezuela saw these suffer, and send "a stream of complaints and entreaties for protection" to Berlin. Matters were particularly bad during the Venezuela civil war of 1892 which had brought Joaquín Crespo to power, which saw six months of anarchy with no effective government, but the civil war of 1898 again saw forced loans and the taking of houses and property. In 1893 the French, Spanish, Belgian, and German envoys in Caracas had agreed that joint action was the best route for settling claims from the 1892 civil war, but in the event reparations in that case had been paid.

While German investment in Venezuela was substantially less than in countries such as Argentina or Brazil, Krupp's Great Venezuela Railway Company, valued at 60m marks, was "individually one of the more valuable German South American ventures", and despite a renegotiation of the concession terms in 1896, payments were irregular after 1897 and stopped in August 1901. In addition, Cipriano Castro, one of a succession of Venezuelan caudillos (military strongmen) to seize the Presidency, halted payment on foreign debts after seizing Caracas in October 1899. Britain had similar grievances, and was owed the bulk of the nearly $15m of debt Venezuela had obtained in 1881 and then defaulted on.

In July 1901 Germany urged Venezuela in friendly terms to pursue international arbitration via the Permanent Court of Arbitration in The Hague. Between February and June 1902 the British representative in Venezuela sent Castro seventeen notes about the British government's concerns, and did not even receive a reply to any of them. Castro assumed that the United States Monroe Doctrine would see the U.S. intervene to prevent European military intervention. Theodore Roosevelt (U.S. President September 1901 – March 1909), however, saw the Doctrine as applying to European seizure of territory, rather than intervention per se. As Vice-President, in July 1901, Roosevelt said that "if any South American country misbehaves toward any European country, let the European country spank it", and reiterated that view to Congress on 3 December 1901.

Preparations 

It remains disputed to this day how the Anglo-German cooperation on Venezuela came about, with varying opinions as to the source of the initiative. In mid-1901, with the distraction of the Boxer Rebellion gone, Chancellor Bernhard von Bülow decided to respond to the German concerns in Venezuela with some form of military intervention, and discussed with the German navy the feasibility of a blockade. Admiral Otto von Diederichs was keen, and recommended occupying Caracas if a blockade didn't succeed. However, disagreements within the German government over whether a blockade should be pacific (permitting neutral ships to pass) or martial (enabling them to be seized) caused delays, and in any case Kaiser Wilhelm II, German Emperor was unconvinced about the military action. In January 1902 the Kaiser declared a delay to any blockade due to the outbreak of another civil war in Venezuela (led by financier Manuel Antonio Matos) which raised the possibility of a more amenable government. Complicating matters were rumours "rampant in the United States and in England" that Germany wanted Margarita Island as a South American naval base; however a May 1900 visit by the German cruiser SMS Vineta had concluded it was unsuitable, and the German navy had become more conscious of how vulnerable such far-flung bases would be. In late 1901, the British Foreign Office became concerned that Britain would look bad if it failed to defend its citizens' interests while Germany took care of theirs, and began sounding out the Germans about a possible common action, initially receiving a negative response. By early 1902, British and German financiers were working together to pressure their respective governments into action. The Italians, who had begun to suspect the existence of plans to enforce debts, sought to be involved too, but Berlin refused. Their participation was agreed to by the British "after Rome had shrewdly pointed out that it could repay the favor in Somalia". The Italians quickly sent the armoured cruiser Carlo Alberto and the protected cruisers Giovanni Bausan and Etna toward the Venezuela coast.

In June 1902, Castro seized a British ship, The Queen, on suspicion of aiding rebels, in another phase of the Venezuelan civil war. This, together with Castro's failure to engage with the British through diplomatic channels, tilted the balance in London in favor of action, with or without German cooperation. By July 1902, the German government was ready to return to the possibility of joint action, with Matos' insurrection having led to further abuses against German citizens and their property, including by government forces. In mid-August, Britain and Germany agreed in principle to go ahead with a blockade later in the year. In September, after the Haitian rebel ship Crête-à-Pierrot hijacked a German ship and seized weapons destined for the Haitian government, Germany sent the gunboat  to Haiti. Panther found the ship and declared that it would sink it, after which the rebel Admiral Hammerton Killick, after evacuating the crew, blew up his ship and himself with it, assisted by fire from Panther. There were concerns about how the United States would view the action in the context of the Monroe Doctrine, but despite U.S. State Department legal advice describing the sinking as "illegal and excessive", the State Department endorsed the action, and The New York Times declared that "Germany was quite within her rights in doing a little housecleaning on her own account". Similarly, the British acquisition of the island of Patos, in the mouth of the Orinoco between Venezuela and the British dependency of Trinidad and Tobago, seemed to cause no concern in Washington, even though as a territorial claim it "skirted dangerously close to challenging the Monroe Doctrine".

On 11 November, at a visit of Kaiser Wilhelm's to his uncle King Edward VII at Sandringham House, an "iron-clad" agreement was signed, albeit leaving key details unresolved beyond the first step of seizing Venezuela's gunboats. The agreement specified that matters with Venezuela should be resolved to the satisfaction of both countries, precluding the possibility of Venezuela making a deal with just one. The agreement was motivated not least by German fears that Britain might withdraw from action, and leave Germany exposed to U.S. anger. The British press reaction to the deal was highly negative, with the Daily Mail declaring that Britain was now "bound by a pledge to follow Germany in any wild enterprise which the German government may think it proper to undertake". In the course of 1902 the U.S. received various indications from Britain, Germany and Italy of an intention to take action, with the U.S. declaring that as long as no territorial acquisition were made, it would not oppose any action. The British minister in Venezuela emphasized the need for secrecy about the plans, saying that he thought the U.S. minister would leak warning to Castro, which would give Castro the opportunity to hide Venezuela's gunboats up the Orinoco River.

On 7 December 1902, both London and Berlin issued ultimatums to Venezuela, even though there was still disagreement about whether to impose a pacific blockade (as the Germans wanted) or a war blockade (as the British wanted). Germany ultimately agreed to a war blockade, and after receiving no reply to their ultimatums, an unofficial naval blockade was imposed on 9 December with SMS Panther, SMS Falke,  and SMS Vineta as major Kaiserliche Marine warships in Caribbean Sea. On 11 December, Italy offered its own ultimatum, which Venezuela also rejected. Venezuela maintained that its national laws were final, and said "the so-named foreign debt ought not to be and never had been a matter of discussion beyond the legal guaranties found in the law of Venezuela on the public debt".

Blockade 

The German naval contingent (numbering four, compared to British eight) followed the British lead in operational terms. On 11 December 1902, Gazelle boarded the old gunboat Restaurador in the port of Guanta. The gunboat was towed at anchor and put into service by the German Captain-Lieutenant Titus Türk with crew members of Gazelle as SMS Restaurador. The ship returned to Venezuela on 23 February 1903; after extensive repairs she was in much better condition than on capture.

The British ships of the Particular Service Squadron under Commodore Robert A.J. Montgomerie included the sloop HMS Alert and the protected cruiser HMS Charybdis. An Italian naval contingent arrived in support of the blockade on 16 December. The blockaders captured four Venezuelan warships, with the Venezuelan navy providing little challenge. Virtually all its ships were captured within two days. The Germans, lacking the capacity to tow them to Curaçao, simply sank two Venezuelan ships that proved unseaworthy. On land, Castro arrested over 200 British and German residents of Caracas, prompting the allies to deploy soldiers to evacuate their citizens. The U.S. Ambassador Herbert W. Bowen negotiated the release of all foreign nationals.

On 13 December, after a British merchant vessel had been boarded and its crew briefly arrested, the British demanded an apology, and failing to receive it, launched a bombardment of Venezuelan forts at Puerto Cabello, assisted by the German . The same day, London and Berlin received from Washington a request forwarded from Castro to submit the dispute to arbitration, which neither Power relished, because of concerns over enforceability of any settlement. In addition, Castro's offer initially covered only claims arising from the 1898 civil war, and made no mention of other claims. Germany believed that these claims should not be subject to arbitration, but London was more willing to agree, accepting arbitration in principle, and suggested a compromise. The threat of arbitration made London move to the next stage in order to negotiate from a position of strength, and 20 December was set for the beginning of the official blockade. As a result of a combination of communications issues and practical delays, the British notice of an official blockade was published on 20 December, but the German blockade of Puerto Cabello was only effected on 22 December, and on Maracaibo on 24 December.

In the meantime, whilst London and Berlin considered Castro's offer, American public opinion increasingly turned against the action, and there were references to the nearby presence of Admiral George Dewey's U.S. fleet, which was conducting long-planned exercises at Puerto Rico. Neither the British government nor the British press considered U.S. intervention a serious possibility. The U.S. did, after the December ultimatums to Venezuela, send an envoy to survey Venezuela's defensive capabilities, and thereby confirmed its confidence that the U.S. Navy could repel a German invasion. The publication of a British government White Paper, revealing the nature of the "iron-clad" agreement, infuriated the British press, not least because the yoking of British and German interests was considered dangerous, and unnecessary for the mere collection of some foreign debts. This was exemplified by Rudyard Kipling's polemic poem "The Rowers", published in The Times on 22 December as a response to the crisis; it included the words "a secret vow ye have made with an open foe ... a breed that have wronged us most ... to help them press for a debt!"

Britain unofficially told the United States on 17 December that it would accept arbitration in principle, and that Germany would soon agree too, as it did on 19 December. Castro's failure to back down left limited options in the face of the Monroe Doctrine, which would make any seizure of Venezuelan territory, even temporarily, problematic. In addition, the negative reaction in the British and American press had raised the costs of the intervention particularly for Germany, whose relations with the U.S. were more fragile than Britain's and who placed great value on the attitude of the British press. Germany had followed the British lead throughout the planning and execution of the operation, and as the British Ambassador in Berlin observed, "The idea of arbitration did not smile on them, but they accepted it at once because we had proposed it".

Mystery of Roosevelt's role
Fourteen years later (during the 1916 a presidential campaign when he was calling for the United States to enter the World War against evil Germany), Roosevelt claimed that Germany's acquiescence to arbitration came from his threat to attack the German ships in Venezuelan waters using Dewey's fleet. Historians have been debating Roosevelt's veracity for a century.  According to historian George Herring in 2011:No evidence has ever been discovered of a presidential ultimatum. Recent research concludes, on the contrary, that although the Germans behaved with their usual heavy-handedness, in general they followed Britain's lead. The British, in turn, went out of their way to avoid undermining their relations with the United States. Both nations accepted arbitration to extricate themselves from an untenable situation and stay on good terms with the United States. 

However historian Shaw Livermore says the Secretary of State's remarks "were as close to a direct threat as it was possible to come in diplomatic parlance". Roosevelt also claimed that Germany had intended to seize a Venezuelan harbor and establish a permanent German military base; and certainly the German representative in Venezuela is known to have had such ambitions. However, historical records suggest the German Kaiser had no interest in such a venture, and that motivations for the intervention lay with the insult to German prestige from Castro's actions. The Kaiser only gave the go ahead after being sure that Britain would play the lead role.

In January 1903, as the blockade continued during the negotiations, the German  attempted to enter the lagoon of Maracaibo, a centre of German commercial activity. On 17 January it exchanged fire with the settlement of Fort San Carlos, but withdrew after half an hour, as shallow waters prevented it getting close enough to the fort to be effective. The Venezuelans claimed this as a victory, and in response the German commander sent Vineta, with heavier weapons, to set an example. On 21 January Vineta bombarded the fort, setting fire to it and destroying it, with the death of 25 civilians in the nearby town. The action had not been approved by the British commander, who had been told by Admiralty after the incident of 13 December not to engage in such action without consulting London; the message was not passed to the German commander, who had been told previously to follow the British commander's lead. The incident caused "considerable negative reaction in the United States against Germany"; the Germans said that the Venezuelans fired first, which the British concurred with but declared the bombardment "unfortunate and inopportune" nonetheless. The German Foreign Office said that Panthers attempted incursion into the lagoon of Maracaibo had been motivated by a desire to ensure the effective blockade of Maracaibo, by preventing Maracaibo from being supplied across the adjacent Colombian border. Subsequently, Roosevelt informed the German Ambassador that Admiral Dewey had orders to be ready to sail to Venezuela from Puerto Rico at an hour's notice.

Outcome 

After agreeing to arbitration in Washington, Britain, Germany, and Italy reached a settlement with Venezuela on 13 February, resulting in the Washington Protocols. Venezuela was represented by the U.S. Ambassador to Caracas Herbert W. Bowen. Venezuela's debts had been very large relative to its income, with the government owing Bs120 million in principal and Bs46m in interest (and another Bs186m claimed in war-related damages), and having an annual income of Bs30m. The agreement reduced the outstanding claims by Bs150m, and created a payment plan taking into account the country's income. Venezuela agreed in principle to pledge 30% of its customs income at its two major ports (La Guaira and Puerto Cabello) to the creditor nations. Each power initially received $27,500, with Germany promised another $340,000 within three months. The blockade was finally lifted on 19 February 1903. The Washington agreements foresaw a series of mixed commissions to adjudicate claims against Venezuela (of respectively one Venezuelan representative, one representative from the claimant nation, and an umpire), and these "worked, with a few exceptions, satisfactorily; their awards were accepted; and the dispute was widely regarded as settled."

However, the blockading nations argued for preferential treatment for their claims, which Venezuela rejected, and on 7 May 1903 a total of ten powers with grievances against Venezuela, including the United States, signed protocols referring the issue to the Permanent Court of Arbitration in The Hague. The Court held on 22 February 1904 that the blockading powers were entitled to preferential treatment in the payment of their claims. Washington disagreed with the decision in principle, and feared it would encourage future European intervention to gain such advantage. As a result, the crisis produced the Roosevelt Corollary to the Monroe Doctrine, described in Roosevelt's 1904 message to Congress. The Corollary asserted a right of the United States to intervene to "stabilize" the economic affairs of small states in the Caribbean and Central America if they were unable to pay their international debts, in order to preclude European intervention to do so. The Venezuela crisis, and in particular the arbitral award, were key in the development of the Corollary.

See also 
 Dutch–Venezuelan crisis of 1908
Anglo-German naval arms race

Notes

References

Further reading
  Forbes, Ian L. D.  "The German Participation in the Allied Coercion of Venezuela 1902–1903", Australian Journal of Politics & History (1978) 24#3 pp 317–331. 
  Greene, Jack and Tucker, Spencer C. "Venezuela Crisis, Second", in Tucker, (ed), The encyclopedia of the Spanish-American and Philippine-American wars: a political, social, and military history (ABC-CLIO, 2009) 1:676–77.
 Kshyk, Christopher J. "Roosevelt's Imperialism: The Venezuelan Crisis, the Panama Canal, and the Origins of the Roosevelt Corollary." Inquiries Journal 7#3 (2015) online.
 Maass, Matthias. "Catalyst for the Roosevelt Corollary: Arbitrating the 1902–1903 Venezuela Crisis and Its Impact on the Development of the Roosevelt Corollary to the Monroe Doctrine," Diplomacy & Statecraft (2009) 20#3 pp 383–402.
 Mitchell, Nancy. "The Height of the German Challenge: The Venezuela Blockade, 1902–3." Diplomatic History 20.2 (1996): 185-210.
  Mitchell, Nancy. The danger of dreams: German and American imperialism in Latin America (U of North Carolina Press, 1999)
 Moris, Edmund. "'A Matter Of Extreme Urgency': Theodore Roosevelt, Wilhelm II, and the Venezuela Crisis of 1902", Naval War College Review (2002) 55#2 pp 73–85.
 "A Student of History" "The Blockade of Venezuela, 1902" History Today (July 1965) 15#7 pp 475–485.

Wars involving Venezuela
Blockades
History of the Royal Navy
Naval history of Germany
Imperial German Navy
20th-century conflicts
United Kingdom–Venezuela relations
Military operations involving the United Kingdom
Military operations involving Germany
Military operations involving Italy
Ultimata
1902 in Venezuela
1903 in Venezuela
1902 in the United States
1903 in the United States
1902 in the United Kingdom
1903 in the United Kingdom
1902 in Germany
1903 in Germany
1902 in Italy
1903 in Italy
Conflicts involving the German Empire
Proxy wars
Political history of Venezuela